Plafond over de vloer is a Dutch television show in nine episodes, aired in 1986 by the VPRO and written and directed by Wim T. Schippers. It derives from the radio show Ronflonflon, and its main character is that show's host, Jacques Plafond.

DVD release
The show was released on DVD as the sixth volume of the series Wim T. Schippers' Televisiepraktijken - sinds 1962, the second disc of a box also containing Hoepla (1967), the first television by Wim T. Schippers, with Wim van der Linden, Willem de Ridder, and Hans Verhagen.

References

External links

1986 Dutch television series debuts
1986 Dutch television series endings
Dutch drama television series
Wim T. Schippers
1980s Dutch television series
Dutch-language television shows
Dutch comedy television series
Television series based on radio series